Kate Steinitz (2 August 1889 - 7 April 1975), informally known as “the Mama of Dada,” played a significant role in the history of art on a number of levels: in the creation of her own art works, as a preserver and collector of the art of her times (the European Bauhaus and Dadaist movements of the early 20th century), as a promoter of art and artists, and, for the last thirty years of her life, as a librarian of the Elmer Belt Library of Vinciana, first when the library was based in the collector's medical offices in downtown Los Angeles, and later as honorary curator when the collection was given to UCLA in 1961.

Steinitz is especially remembered for collaborative work with the artist Kurt Schwitters, and, in later life, her scholarship on Leonardo da Vinci.

Life
Kate (at first called Käte or Käthe) Traumann was born into an upper-middle-class family in Beuthen, Upper Silesia (now Bytom, Poland). In 1899, her father, Judge Arnold Traumann, was transferred to Berlin, where she was educated.   She attending drawing classes with Käthe Kollwitz and later the "Malschule für Frauen" (Women's Painting School) run by the artist Lovis Corinth. She also attended the Academie und Studienateliers fuer Malerei und Plastik (connected with the Berlin Secession art association), and at the Académie de la Grande Chaumière and the Sorbonne in Paris.

In 1912 or 1913, after returning from a study visit in Paris, she married a physician, Dr. Ernst Steinitz (March 25, 1881 - Feb 1, 1942).  With the outbreak of war in 1914, her husband joined the army as a military physician. In 1917, he was called to the front, and in 1918 the Steinitz family, which now included daughters Ilse and Lotti, relocated to Hanover. A third daughter, Beate, was born in 1920.

While in Hanover, Steinitz painted portraits of her daughters. Other favored subjects for her drawings and paintings included dancers, entertainers, and other performers. She became highly involved in the local art scene, including the burgeoning Dada movement.

Steinitz collaborated with her friend, the artist Kurt Schwitters on several projects, including children's books, opera librettos, books, and festivals. Together with Theo van Doesburg, Schwitters and Steinitz produced several children's fairy-tale books that featured unusual typography, including Hahnepeter (Peter the Rooster, 1924), Die Märchen vom Paradies (The Fairy Tales of Paradise, 1924–25), and Die Scheuche (The Scarecrow, 1925). For the publication of their work, the artists founded their own publishing house, which they called APOSS, an acronym that stood for "A=active; P=paradox; OS=oppose sentimentality; S=sensitive."

Steinitz also began to write for the newspaper the Hannoverscher Kurier, and in various journals of the Berlin publisher Ullstein Verlag, using her own name as well as under the pseudonyms "Annette Nobody" and "Mia Meyer."

In 1936, the Steinitz family immigrated to New York City to escape Nazi persecution, after having been told by government authorities that she could no longer write for German publications. While in New York Steinitz continued to paint, and to  augment the family's income by doing freelance commercial art work and research assignments. She also began working as a book scout for Los Angeles-based antiquarian book dealer Jake Zeitlin, who was helping collector Elmer Belt build his Leonardo da Vinci collection.

In 1941, Steinitz's youngest daughter Beate, age 20, died in Palestine of an illness. This loss was followed on February 1, 1942, by the death of her husband Dr. Ernst Steinitz under unusual circumstances. He was found dead on the floor of his consulting room at 147 East 50th St. at 11:00 p.m. by his wife. He had written a note to her in German in which he described a variety of symptoms and had decided from them that he was suffering from coronary thrombosis. The note said he was in great pain and intended to take morphine by injection, but there was no mention of suicide in the note and there was no evidence that the hypodermic syringe that was found on a desk near him had been used. This caused police who investigated the death to believe that he might have died of a heart attack before he could use the morphine.

In August 1942, Steinitz moved to San Francisco, California to be closer to her daughter Ilse.

In 1944, she became an American citizen and relocated to Los Angeles. She consulted Dr. Belt about a medical problem, and he recognized her attraction to and interest in his Leonardo collection. And though she had no formal academic credentials or training in librarianship, he appreciated her sophistication, intelligence, language skills, wide network of friendships abroad, and knowledge of art and books. Grateful to Dr. Belt for steady and fulfilling work, Steinitz threw herself into the job, transforming herself into a serious Leonardo scholar. In 1958, she published an important bibliography of the Treatise on Painting and in 1969 she was invited to deliver the annual Lettura Vinciana in Vinci, Italy, the highest honor for contributors to the field of Leonardo studies. In 1961, when the collection was transferred to UCLA, by which time she was 72, she was appointed Honorary Curator of the Elmer Belt Library of Vinciana by Librarian Lawrence Clark Powell and Chancellor Franklin D. Murphy and continued to be a regular presence in the Library.

Despite her professional turn towards scholarship, Steinitz's artistic, bohemian, and fun-loving side remained fully intact during her Los Angeles years. Both European and American art world figures called on her in her West Los Angeles apartment, where she had important work created by the artistic luminaries of her youth including El Lissitzky, Kurt Schwitters, László Moholy-Nagy, Paul Klee, Wassily Kandinsky, Auguste Rodin, Otto Nebel, Franz Marc, and others. Her friends in Los Angeles included members of the German-Jewish émigré community, contemporary innovators like Buckminster Fuller, and people across the spectrum of the art world. On the occasion of her 80th birthday in 1969, the Los Angeles County Museum of art organized an exhibition consisting of both her own work and art from her personal collection. For the opening, Steinitz wore a silver lamé sheath and a headband with antennae-like bobbling balls and declared to friends that she was “Ready for the Space Age.”

Some of Steinitz's art collection went to the Los Angeles County Museum of Art, but most of it was placed by Steinitz's daughter Ilse Berg at the Vincent Price Art Museum at East Los Angeles College.

In 1963, she published a book on Kurt Schwitters in German, with an English edition being published in 1968.

Steinitz died on April 7, 1975, Los Angeles.

In 1994, a retrospective of her work was held at Severin Wunderman Museum, a private museum in Irvine, California which existed from 1985 to 1995.

Further reading
Steinitz, Kate Traumann, and William A. Emboden. 1994. Kate T. Steinitz: art into life into art : a retrospective of the life and work of one of the most diverse Bauhaus and Dada artists. Irvine, Calif: The Museum.

Kate Steinitz: Art and Collection: Avant-Garde Art in Germany in the 1920s and 1930s. San Bernardino, CA: The Art Gallery, California State College San Bernardino, April 10 - May 14, 1982.

"Kate Steinitz, Librarian, Artist, Scholar: Being a Thirteen-Part Tribute to One Whose Verve Has Enlivened Some Eight Decades on Two Continents." Wilson Library Bulletin, 44, no. 5 (January 1970): 512–537. Contributions by Elmer Belt, Justin Bier, Bates Lowry, Jacob Zeitlin, Peter Selz, Jean Sutherland Boggs, Ladislao Reti, Weiland Schmeid, Robert Haas, Walter Hopps, J.M. Edelstein, and William A. Emboden, Jr.

Archival sources 
Steinitz (Kate Traumann) Papers, (Collection 1770). UCLA Library Special Collections, Charles E. Young Research Library, University of California, Los Angeles. http://www.oac.cdlib.org/findaid/ark:/13030/c8d79hxc/admin/?query=steinitz#aspace_4eb2d304ff7b831120cd3e010da45e67 Processed and opened for research 2017–18.

A Finding Aid to the Kate Steinitz Papers, circa 1910–2002, in the Archives of American Art, Smithsonian Institution. https://sova.si.edu/record/AAA.steikate?s=90&n=10&t=C&q=Poems&i=92 Processed and opened for research 2016.

Schwitters-Steinitz Collection, National Gallery of Art in Washington, D.C libraryimage.nga.gov/doc/pdf/schwitters_steinitz.pdf  Processed in 1993; with additional items purchased in 1997 and processed in 2007.

Notes

External links
 Photograph of Kate Steinitz, 1928, Hanover, Germany, Archives of American Art, Smithsonian Institution
Photograph of Ilse, Beate, and Lotti Steinitz, daughters of Kate Steinitz, circa 1930, Archives of American Art, Smithsonian Institution
Backstroke, 1930, Photograph by Kate Steinitz, Steinitz-Berg Family Art Collection, MoMA
Photograph of Kate Steinitz in the da Vinci library, Ottonebel.org

1889 births
1975 deaths
People from Bytom
American art historians
People from the Province of Silesia
Women art historians
German emigrants to the United States
Dada
American women historians